Shepherd group may refer to:
Shepherd Building Group
Shephard groups, in mathematics